Nita is a given name. It is also a short form of the given names Juanita and Bonita. People named Nita include:

Nita Ambani (born 1964), Indian businesswoman and wife of industrialist Mukesh Ambani
Nita Barrow (1916–1995), first and only female Governor-General of Barbados, nurse and humanitarian activist
Nita Cavalier (1906-1969), American silent film and stage actress.
Nita Fernando, Sri Lankan actress
Nita Kibble (1879–1962), first female librarian with the State Library of New South Wales
Nita Lowey (born 1937), American politician
Nita Mehta, Indian celebrity chef, author, restaurateur and media personality
Nita Naldi (1894-1961), American silent film actress
Nita Strauss, (born 1986), American musician 
Nita Talbot (born 1930), American actress

Fictional characters 

Namorita, a Marvel Comics superhero commonly known as Nita
Nita, in Disney's direct-to-video animated movie Brother Bear 2
Nita, a leading character from the Young Wizards fantasy series
the protagonist of Nita Negrita, a 2011 Philippine television drama
Katrina Samoushenka, who was named Nita, corrupted from Incognita, by Ted Williamson in The Arcadian Deer in The Labours of Hercules by Agatha Christie

See also

Nina (name)
Niña (name)